Manduca extrema is a moth of the  family Sphingidae. It is known from Venezuela, Ecuador and Bolivia.

Adults have been recorded in October.

References

Manduca
Moths described in 1926